Annamária Bónis (born 5 February 1974) is a Hungarian alpine skier. She competed in three events at the 1992 Winter Olympics. At the Albertville Games, she competed in three alpine skiing events - she placed 43rd in the supergiant, placed 34th in the giant slalom, and did not finish the slalom and was not classified.

References

1974 births
Living people
Hungarian female alpine skiers
Olympic alpine skiers of Hungary
Alpine skiers at the 1992 Winter Olympics
Sportspeople from Miercurea Ciuc